For other uses, see Hostel (disambiguation). For the Spanish lodging, see Hostal. For student housing, see Dormitory.

A hostel is a form of low-cost, short-term shared sociable lodging where guests can rent a bed, usually a bunk bed in a dormitory, with shared use of a lounge and sometimes a kitchen. Rooms can be mixed or single-sex and have private or shared bathrooms. Private rooms may also be available, but the property must offer dormitories to be considered a hostel.  Hostels are popular forms of lodging for backpackers. They are part of the sharing economy.  Benefits of hostels include lower costs and opportunities to meet people from different places, find travel partners, and share travel ideas.  Some hostels, such as 
 in India or Hostelling International, cater to a niche market of travelers. For example, one hostel might feature in-house social gatherings such as movie nights or communal dinners, another might feature local tours, one might be known for its parties, and another might have a quieter place to relax in serenity, or be located on the beach.  Newer hostels focus on a more trendy design interior, some of which are on par with boutique hotels.  Some may cater to older digital nomads, global nomads, and perpetual travelers that prefer slightly more upmarket private rooms or a quieter atmosphere. 

Many hostels are locally owned and operated, and are often cheaper for both the operator and occupants than hotels. Hostels may offer long-term lodging to guests for free or at a discount in exchange for work as a receptionist or in housekeeping.

There are approximately 10,000 hostels in Europe and approximately 300 hostels in the United States.  The typical guest is between 16 and 34 years old, although it can vary depending on the country. 

In addition to shared kitchen facilities, some hostels have a restaurant and/or bar. Washing machines and clothes dryers are often provided for an additional fee. Hostels sometimes have entryways for storing gear. Most hostels offer lockers for safely storing valuables. Some bare-bones hostels do not provide linens.  Some hostels may have a curfew and daytime lockouts, and some, albeit few, require occupants to do chores apart from washing and drying after food preparation. 

A mobile hostel is a temporary hostel that can take the form of a campsite, bus, van, or a short-term arrangement in a permanent building. They have been used at large festivals or trips where there is a shortage of lodging. 

In some cities, hostels reported a higher average income per room than hotels. For example, in Honolulu, Hawaii, upscale hotels reported average daily room rates of $173 in 2006, while hostel rooms brought in as much as $200 per night, for rooms of eight guests paying $25 each.  Even during the financial crisis of 2007–2008, many hostels reported increased occupancy numbers at a time when hotel bookings were down. 

A 2013 study in Australia showed that youth travel was the fastest-growing travel demographic and that the hostel industry was growing at a faster rate than the hotel industry. It showed that youth travel can lead to higher overall spending due to longer trips than traditional vacations.  In New Zealand, backpackers hostels had a 13.5% share of lodging guests/nights in 2007.

Issues related to hostels 
Guests are advised to use etiquette due to issues with communal lodging including 

 There is less privacy in a hostel than in a hotel. Sharing sleeping areas in a dormitory and bathrooms might not be comfortable for those requiring more privacy. However, the shared lodging makes it easier to meet new people. Some hostels encourage more social interaction between guests due to the shared sleeping areas and communal areas. Lounges typically have sofas and chairs, coffee tables, board games, books or book exchange, computers, and Internet access.
 Nearly all hostels have a shared communal kitchen area for the preparation of food and a storage area with refrigerators. Most hostels have a label system to identify the owner of the food. Some hostels will have a labeled "free shelf" where guests can leave unwanted food. Theft of food can happen. 
 Noise can make sleeping difficult, whether from snoring, talking, and social activities in the lounge, people staying up to read with the light on, or someone either returning late from bars or leaving early. To mitigate the effects, many guests use earplugs and blindfolds.

History 
In August 1909, Richard Schirrmann, a teacher in Germany, first published his idea of inexpensive accommodation for youth travel after leading a school camping trip that was derailed by a thunderstorm. Schirrmann received considerable support and opened a makeshift hostel for hikers in the school in which he taught. 

On June 1, 1912, Schirrmann opened the first hostel in Altena Castle. The original hostel rooms are now a museum. 

Schirrmann served in World War I and after observing a Christmas Truce on the Western Front in December 1915, he wondered whether "thoughtful young people of all countries could be provided with suitable meeting places where they could get to know each other". In 1919, he founded the German Youth Hostel Association.

By 1932, Germany had more than 2,000 hostels recording more than 4.5 million overnights annually.  The International Youth Hostel Federation (now Hostelling International) was founded in October 1932. It is now an organization composed of more than 90 hostel associations representing over 4,500 hostels in over 80 countries.  These hostels cater more to school-aged children, sometimes through school trips, and families with school-aged children.

In 1936, Franklin D. Roosevelt was the honorary president of AYH (now Hostelling International USA). John D. Rockefeller III was a proponent of hostels and was president for several years. 

During World War II, many hostels in Europe were temporarily shut down or placed under the control of the Hitler Youth. 

In the 1960s and 1970s, hostelling prospered.

The industry declined during the 1970s energy crisis.

Hostels continued to grow during the financial crisis of 2007–2008 in part due to their cost appeal. 

After the Great Recession, the industry grew rapidly in New York City, Rome, Buenos Aires, and Miami.  However, a 2010 law curbed the growth of hostels in New York City.

See also
 Bed and breakfast
 Hotel
 Inn
 Motel

References

 
Adventure travel
Backpacking
Hotel types
Tourist accommodations